Denning can refer to any of the following:

Places
Denning (lunar crater), a crater located on the far side of the moon
Denning (Martian crater), a crater on Mars
Denning (Munich), a district of Munich, Germany
Denning, New York, a town in Ulster County, New York, US
Denning, Arkansas, a town in Franklin County, Arkansas, US

People
Blaine Denning (1930–2016), American basketball player
Chris Denning (born 1941), British-Slovak disc jockey
Dorothy E. Denning (born 1945), American information security researcher
Margaret B. Denning (1856-1935), American missionary and temperance worker
Norman Denning (1904–1979), British officer of the Royal Navy and brother of Reginald and Tom Denning
Peter J. Denning (born 1942), American computer scientist
Sir Reginald Denning (1894–1990), British army officer
Richard Denning (1914–1998), American actor
Richard J Denning (born 1967), British author
Robert Denning (1927–2005), American socialite and interior designer
Scott Denning, American atmospheric scientist
Sheila Mary Denning, British artist
Tom Denning, Baron Denning (1899–1999), British lawyer and judge
Troy Denning (born 1958), American writer
William A. Denning (1817–1856) American jurist and politician
William Frederick Denning (1848–1931), British amateur astronomer

Other
Denning, a form of hibernation
Denning Manufacturing Australian bus manufacturer

See also
Dening (disambiguation)
Dunning (disambiguation)